Stephen Bernard MacNeil (born March 7, 1950) is a Canadian retired professional ice hockey forward who played 4 games in the National Hockey League for the St. Louis Blues.

MacNeil was born in Sudbury, Ontario.  In addition to his time with the Blues, he also played 119 games in the World Hockey Association with the Los Angeles Sharks and Cincinnati Stingers.

External links
 

1950 births
Living people
Canadian ice hockey forwards
Cincinnati Stingers players
Detroit Red Wings draft picks
Greensboro Generals (EHL) players
Ice hockey people from Ontario
Los Angeles Sharks players
St. Louis Blues players
Sportspeople from Greater Sudbury